The Goulburn Valley Football Association (GVFA) is an Australian rules football competition that was first established in 1888 in the Goulburn Valley of Victoria, Australia, with the foundation clubs being Cobram, Muckatah, Nathalia, Numurkah, Wunghnu and Yarroweyah.

This football competition was separate to the Goulburn Valley District Football Association that was formed in 1893, that is still active today and now called the Goulburn Valley Football League.

History

The original GVFA was a football association that catered for the smaller rural towns of the Goulburn Valley region until 1931, when it was superseded by the Murray Football League when it was first established in 1931.

There was another Goulburn Valley Football Association, in 1890 and 1891, comprising the following teams – Baldwinsville, Mooroopna, Shepparton, Tatura and Undera, with Mooroopna winning the title in 1890 and Undera defeating Mooroopna to win the 1891 – Elder's Hotel (Undera) Medals.

Between 1901 and 1906, Drumanure Football Club won six consecutive premierships.

In 1911, Muckatah went through the season undefeated when the Muckatah Bombers defeated Numurkah in the grand final on "the pretty tree embowered Drumanure ground" and Muckatah player, George Grant had the distinction of playing in three premiership teams in 1911, with Essendon Football Club VFA team, Tocumwal and Muckatah!

In 1911, a Goulburn Valley Junior Football Association was established with the following clubs competing – Boomanoomana, Burramine South, Cobram, Katamatite and Muckatah.

Between 1904 and 1920, the GVFA comprised enough teams to divide it into two divisions (North and South) to minimise travel for clubs to away matches, which was a big issue around 1900. At its peak the GVFA comprised 14 teams in 1906.

The GVFA went into recess from 1916 to 1918 due to World War I.

In 1932, an attempt was made to revive the GVFA, but a lack of interest from clubs meant the association permanently closed down.

Goulburn Valley Second Eighteens Football Association (1926–1936) and renaming
The Goulburn Valley Second Eighteens Football Association (GVSEFA) superseded the Ardmona Central Junior Football Association, and was established in 1926 from the following Goulburn Valley clubs – Ardmona, Dookie, Mooroopna, Shepparton East and Undera, with Mr Brophy as president and Mr J Pearson as secretary as the initial office bearers.

This competition ran for eleven seasons, from 1926 to 1936 and was a completely separate competition to the Goulburn Valley Football Association.

Sir John Gladstone Black McDonald, who would later become the 37th Premier of Victoria, was President of the GVSEFA from 1927 to 1933.

The GVSEFA was a Saturday afternoon competition, while the Goulburn Valley Football League was a Wednesday afternoon competition.

At the AGM of the GVSEFA in 1937 it was proposed to change the name of the association to just the Goulburn Valley Football Association and this was approved at the next delegates meeting in March, where it was also agreed to retain the junior status of the competition in favour of a senior football competition. 1937.

During this era, the "new" GVFA was played on Saturdays and the Goulburn Valley Football League was played on Wednesdays, with the new GVFA a more Shepparton based competition, with the grand final being played on the Shepparton Recreation Reserve (now Deakin Reserve) each year.

In 1940, Shepparton Imperials' committee decide to drop the "Imperials" from its name and would be known as just the Shepparton Football Club.

The GVFA went into recess between 1942 and 1944 due to World War II. During the late stages of World War II, the GVFA was revived in 1945, with the following teams competing – Ardmona, Dookie, Dookie College, Katandra, Mooroopna, Shepparton, Shepparton East, SPC and Tatura. Sheppparton East defeated SPC in the grand final and John McLeish from Dookie College won the 1945 – GVFA Best and Fairest / Shepparton Advertiser Trophy.

The GVFA changed its name to the Central Goulburn Valley Football League at the 1946 GVFA – AGM, when the Goulburn Valley Football League was re-established in 1946.

The Central Goulburn Valley Football League officially went into recess at their AGM, in March, 1953, but was never reformed.

Former GVFA Clubs:1888 to 1930

Participating Football Clubs in the GVSEFA (1926–1936)
The following clubs competed in the GVSEFA in the following years – 
Ardmona: 1926, 1927, 1928, 1929, 1930, 1931, 1932, 1933, 1934, 1935 & 1936 (11). Joined the Goulburn Valley Football Association in 1937. 
Benbatha: 1928, 1929, 1930 (3)
Cosgrove: 1927, 1928, 1929 (3)
Dookie: 1926 (1). Joined the Dookie Football Association in 1927.
Dookie College: 1927, 1928 (2). Did not play any competition football until 1939, when they joined the Tatong Thoona Football League.
Dookie / Cosgrove: 1930 (1). Both club's joined the Katandra Football Association in 1931, as separate clubs.
Katandra: 1936 (1). Joined the Goulburn Valley Football Association in 1937.
Lemnos: 1928, 1929, 1930, 1931, 1932, 1933, 1934, 1935 & 1936 (9). Joined the Goulburn Valley Football Association in 1937. 
Mooroopna: 1926, 1927, 1928, 1929, 1930, 1931, 1932, 1933, 1934, 1935 & 1936 (11). Joined the Goulburn Valley Football Association in 1937.
Shepparton East: 1926 (1). Club went into recess in 1927.
Shepparton Imperials: 1927, 1928, 1929, (1930 – GVFA), 1931, 1932, 1933, 1934, 1935 & 1936 (9). Joined the Goulburn Valley Football Association in 1937.
Tallygaroopna: 1930, 1931, 1932, 1933, 1934, 1935 & 1936 (7). Joined the Goulburn Valley Football Association in 1937.
Tatura: 1933, 1934, 1935 (3)
Toolamba: 1931, 1932, 1933, 1934, 1935 & 1936 (6). Joined the Goulburn Valley Football Association in 1937.
Undera: 1926, 1927, 1928, 1929, 1930, 1931, 1932, 1933, 1934, 1935 & 1936 (11). Joined the Goulburn Valley Football Association in 1937.
Wunghnu: 1931, 1932, 1933, 1934, 1935, 1936 (6). Joined the Goulburn Valley Football Association in 1937.

Number of teams in the GVSEFA per year
1926: 5 
1927: 6 
1928: 8 
1929: 7 
1930: 7 
1931: 8 
1932: 8 
1933: 9 
1934: 9 
1935: 9 
1936: 9

GVFA Clubs: 1937 to 1945
The following clubs participated in the GFVA between 1937 and 1945. The GVFA was in recess between 1942 & 1944, due to World War II.

GVFA Grand Final Results

References

Defunct Australian rules football competitions in Victoria (Australia)